"Fight for You" is a song originally recorded by Stevie Hoang, featuring Iyaz, for his third independent album, Unsigned (2011).
It was later performed by American recording artist Jason Derulo, released as the fourth single from his second studio album, Future History, on December 2, 2011. The song was written by Derulo, Hoang, David Paich and Jeff Porcaro, while production was handled by RedOne, BeatGeek and Geo Slam. Musically, "Fight for You" is an urban-pop ballad, that samples the song "Africa" (1982) by American rock band Toto. The lyrics revolve around how Derulo, the protagonist, has "got a girl in his life he isn't ready to let go of just yet". Hoang had originally recorded "Fight for You" for his third independent album, Unsigned (2011) with his original track featuring Iyaz.

The song's production and Derulo's vocal performance garnered positive reviews from music critics, however, some criticized its lack of originality. "Fight for You" attained moderate chart success, peaking at number five in Australia, and reaching the top twenty in the United Kingdom. The accompanying music video portrays a fictional relationship between Derulo and his love interest. Derulo performed the song at KDWB-FM's annual Jingle Ball in 2011.

Jason Derulo version 
"Fight for You" was written by Jason Derulo, Stevie Hoang, David Paich and Jeff Porcaro, while production of the song was helmed by RedOne, BeatGeek and Geo Slam.

Derulo's version of "Fight for You" was recorded and engineered by Gelly Kusuma, Slam and Teddy Sky at Serenity West Recording Studio and Jim Henson Studios in Los Angeles, California. Derulo, RedOne, Laila Khayat, Samya Khayat and Sky performed background vocals on the song. The recordings were later mixed by Trevor Muzzy. All instruments and programming were provided by RedOne, BeatGeek and Slam. In a cover story for the Daily Star, Derulo stated that "Fight for You" was the first song he worked on with RedOne, saying "I'm glad it turned out so dope". On working with RedOne, he said: "Red first became hot when he produced the album The Fame with Lady Gaga. He is one of the nicest guys I've ever met. ... RedOne was a nice, humble, down-to-earth, special person".

"Fight for You" was added to mainstream radio playlists in the United Kingdom on November 9, 2011. A digital extended play, featuring four remixes of the song, was released in Ireland and the UK on December 2, 2011.

Composition 

"Fight for You" is an urban-pop ballad with a length of four minutes and two seconds. According to Meena Rupani of DesiHits, the song finds Derulo as the male protagonist singing "that he's got a girl in his life he isn't ready to let go of just yet". The song contains a sample of the song "Africa" (1982) by American rock band Toto. Lewis Corner of Digital Spy noted that "Fight for You" features "airy synths and bouncy castle-sized beats". During an interview with New! magazine, Derulo explained the concept of "Fight for You", saying: "It's very relationship-based and the line ["fight for you"] means so much, whatever you believe in you should go for. The song is based on a personal experience, I was in a relationship and I put myself in that place again where you would do anything to keep the relationship together so I went back to that place."

Critical reception 
"Fight for You" garnered positive reviews from music critics for its catchy production and Derulo's vocal performance. David Griffiths of 4Music called it a "catchy little ditty" that "is guaranteed to be stuck in your head for the rest of the day". Shawn Kitchener of Entertainment Wise described the song as "the kind of sweet-as-candy R&B fodder" that could have been featured on the High School Musical soundtrack. Meena Rupani of DesiHits noted that the song's lyrical theme is similar to "It Girl", and that Derulo's "vocals are enough to put any girl into a trance". However, "Fight for You" also received unfavorable reviews from critics because of its lack of originality. Lewis Corner of Digital Spy gave the song a three out of five star rating, calling Derulo "extremely lazy" for sampling "Africa". Caroline Sullivan of The Guardian described the song as "languid", while writing that the sample gives it "a bit of bounce". Although Jess Holton of The Music Network described "Fight for You" as a "touching ballad", she added that sampling "Africa" does not do the latter "any form of justice". In an album review of Future History, Michael Cragg of BBC Music noted that the songs "revolve around the joys of being in a relationship or the pain of not being in one", however disapproved of the lyrical content and sample in "Fight for You", calling it "perhaps the worst offender" on the album.

Commercial performance
After the release of Future History, "Fight for You" debuted and peaked on the US Billboard Hot 100 at number 83 on the issue dated October 15, 2011, and on the UK Singles Chart at number 117 on October 22, 2011. Upon its release as a single in the latter country, "Fight for You" managed to peak at number 15 on the UK Singles Chart, and at number four on the UK R&B Singles Chart. In Ireland, the song debuted at number 31 on December 1, 2011, and peaked at number 28 the following week. On the Danish Singles Chart, "Fight for You" debuted and peaked at number 27 on January 20, 2012. In Australia, the song debuted at number 27 on the ARIA Singles Chart on February 20, 2012. "Fight for You" peaked at number five in its third week, and spent a total of seven consecutive weeks inside the top-ten. It was eventually certified double platinum by the Australian Recording Industry Association (ARIA), denoting shipments of 140,000 copies.

Promotion

Music video 
The video for "Fight for You" premiered online on November 25, 2011. It begins with Derulo walking on a bridge in a city at night, before the video cuts to scenes of Derulo and his love interest hugging and drinking alcohol, as well showing him standing alone atop a roof of a building in Manhattan. Another scene finds Derulo and his love interest sharing a shower. The video continues to show the pair spending time together, including dining in restaurants, riding the subway, and dancing on the subway platform. David Greenwald of MTV Buzzworthy called it Derulo's "steamiest" video to date.

Live performances and cover version
On December 3, 2011, Derulo performed "Fight for You" at radio station KDWB-FM's annual Jingle Ball, which took place at the Target Center in Minneapolis, Minnesota. The song was part of a set list, which included "Whatcha Say", "In My Head", "Ridin' Solo", "Don't Wanna Go Home" and "It Girl". According to Jon Bream of the Star Tribune, Derulo "turned it out with sweet vocals and smooth dancing". On May 21, 2012, Taga Paa performed a cover of "Fight for You" on The Voice Australia. Rosemarie Lentini of The Daily Telegraph called it a "moving rendition", while Seanna Cronin of The Gympie Times noted that Paa's performance "had a few pitch issues".

Track listing 
Digital EP
 "Fight for You" – 4:02
 "Fight for You" (Suncycle Remix) – 3:34
 "Fight for You" (Mync Edit) – 3:25
 "Fight for You" (Mync Stadium Dub) – 5:34
 "Fight for You" (Mync Stadium Mix) – 5:34

Credits and personnel 
Credits adapted from the liner notes for Future History.

BeatGeek – production, instruments and programming
Jason Derulo – songwriting, lead vocals, background vocals
Stevie Hoang – songwriting
Laila Khayat – background vocals
Samya Khayat – background vocals
Gelly Kusuma – recording, engineering

Trevor Muzzy – mixing
David F. Paich – songwriting
Jeffrey T. Porcaro – songwriting
RedOne – production, background vocals, instruments and programming
Teddy Sky – recording, engineering, background vocals
Geo Slam – production, recording, engineering, instruments and programming, guitar

Charts and certifications

Weekly charts

Year-end charts

Certifications 

|-

Release history

References 

2011 songs
2011 singles
2010s ballads
Jason Derulo songs
Song recordings produced by RedOne
Songs written by Jeff Porcaro
Songs written by David Paich
Warner Records singles
Music videos directed by Colin Tilley
Pop ballads
Toto (band)